Lovely Times: Noriko Part III is the fourth studio album by Japanese entertainer Noriko Sakai. Released through Victor Entertainment on August 21, 1988, the album features the single "Ichioku no Smile (Please Your Smile)". In addition, the songs "Try Again...!" and "Active Heart" were used as the ending and opening themes, respectively, of the 1988 anime OVA series Gunbuster. Chage and Aska were involved in the album's songwriting process. The album cover was shot in London as part of Sakai's photo book Lovely Times: Noriko Sakai in Europe

The album peaked at No. 8 on Oricon's albums chart.

Track listing 
All music is arranged by Motoki Funayama, except where indicated.

Charts

References

External links
 
 
 

1988 albums
Japanese-language albums
Victor Entertainment albums